Eric Carter (born February 19, 1972) is an American politician who served for two terms as a Republican member of the Kansas House of Representatives, from 2003 to 2006. He represented the 48th District in the Kansas House, residing in Overland Park, Kansas.

References

Living people
1972 births
Republican Party members of the Kansas House of Representatives
Politicians from Overland Park, Kansas
21st-century American politicians